Jit Bahadur Khatri Chhetri (born 1947) is a Nepalese long-distance runner. He competed in the marathon at the 1972 Summer Olympics, where he did not finish.

References

External links
 

1947 births
Living people
Athletes (track and field) at the 1972 Summer Olympics
Nepalese male long-distance runners
Nepalese male marathon runners
Olympic athletes of Nepal
Place of birth missing (living people)
20th-century Nepalese people